Joan Haste is an 1895 novel by English writer H. Rider Haggard. Set primarily in London, it is the story of a love affair hampered by differences in social class and ending in tragedy.

References

External links
Complete novel at Project Gutenberg Australia  
Images and bibliographic information for various editions of Joan Haste at SouthAfricaBooks.com
Formats at Project Gutenberg United States

Novels by H. Rider Haggard
1895 British novels